is an autobahn in northwestern Germany. It connects the city of Wilhelmshaven to Oldenburg and the A 1, running very roughly from north to south.

Traffic currently is light, but an increase in freight traffic is to be expected when the JadeWeserPort in Wilhelmshaven becomes operational.

Exit list 

 

 
 

|}

External links 

 History of the Ahlhorn Highway Airstrip

29
A029